Edgerton Alvord Throckmorton (July 30, 1928 – June 5, 1990), known as Peter Throckmorton, was an American photojournalist and a pioneer underwater archaeologist. Throckmorton was a founding member of the Sea Research Society and served on its Board of Advisors until his death in 1990. He was also a trustee for NUMA and was an instructor at Nova Southeastern University.

Discoveries 
 The Cape Gelidonya shipwreck (c. 1200 BC) was discovered near the eponymous Cape Gelidonya, Turkey by Throckmorton in 1959 using information provided him by Kemal Aras, a sponge diver from Bodrum, Turkey who had first seen parts of the vessel's cargo of bronze ingots in 1954, but who had failed to recognize that it was actually a Bronze Age shipwreck and thus its archaeological importance. The ship is believed to have been Syrian.

 The Yassi Ada shipwreck (c. 4th century AD) was discovered in a fully silted ancient Roman harbor at Yassi Ada, Turkey, by Peter Throckmorton and Honor Frost in 1958, but was not fully surveyed and excavated until 1967–69.

 The Pantano Longarini wreck (c. 600-650 AD), found by Peter Throckmorton and Gerhard Kapitän at Pantano Longarini, Italy in 1965, is of Greek or Southern Italian origin.

 The Dokos shipwreck (c. 2250-2050 BC) was discovered near Hydra Island, Greece, in 1975 by Peter Throckmorton who found cargo from an obviously sunken ship at 20 meters depth. The cargo consisted of pottery of the Cycladic type. This is possibly the oldest wreck discovered to date.

Peter also discovered the 1877 Aberdeen-built iron bark Elissa lying off the shipbreaker's yard in Perama, Greece.  From her lines and fittings and his experience sailing aboard a 'Downeaster' as a teenager, he knew Elissa for what she was – one of the last square-rig ships still in the trade, even if greatly modified, of smuggling cigarettes. His efforts, combined with those of the San Francisco Maritime Museum's founder Karl Kortum, saved the ship until she could find a safe haven with the Galveston Historical Society. She is now completely restored and  considered one of the finest nineteenth-century tall ships still sailing.

Publications 

 The Sea Remembers: Shipwrecks and Archaeology from Homer's Greece to the Rediscovery of the Titanic, ed. Peter Throckmorton (New York: Smithmark Publishers, 1987)  Library of Congress: 87-14273
 Oldest Known Shipwreck Yields Bronze Age Cargo. by Peter Throckmorton, National Geographic 121.5 (May 1962): 696-71
 The Lost Ships: An Adventure in Underwater Archaeology. by Peter Throckmorton, Boston and Toronto, 1964. 
 The economics of treasure hunting with real life comparisons, by Peter Throckmorton, 1990
 Surveying in Archaeology, by Peter Throckmorton (Aris & Phillips Ltd  - Jan 1, 1969)  
 Diving for Treasure, by Peter Throckmorton, published simultaneously by The Viking Press, New York City, and Penguin Books Canada Limited (1977)  Library of Congress: 77-6689
 History from the Sea, edited by Peter Throckmorton, 
 Shipwrecks and Archaeology: The Unharvested Sea, published simultaneously by Little, Brown and Company, Boston, and Little, Brown & Company (Canada) Limited, Toronto (1970), Library of Congress: 76-79373

Footnotes 

1928 births
1990 deaths
20th-century American non-fiction writers
American people of English descent
American underwater divers
Nova Southeastern University faculty
People from Newcastle, Maine
Peter
Underwater archaeologists